Andrej Šťastný (born 24 January 1991) is a Slovak professional ice hockey player who currently playing for HK Dukla Trenčín of the Slovak Extraliga.

Playing career
Šťastný began playing junior ice hockey in his hometown club HK 95 Považská Bystrica. He also played junior hockey in MsHK Žilina and HK Dukla Trenčín. He was selected to the HK Orange 20 project to preparation for the World Junior Championship in 2010. He overall played 46 games and recorded 23 points for Orange 20 within two seasons. In 2010 he moved to North America to play for the WHL club Vancouver Giants. He recorded 30 points in 32 games in the 2010–11 WHL season. Before the 2011–12 season he came back to Slovakia, signing for HK Dukla Trenčín.

International play
Šťastný participated at the 2010 World Junior Ice Hockey Championships and 2011 World Junior Ice Hockey Championships. He also played at the 2009 IIHF World U18 Championships.

Career statistics

Regular season and playoffs

International

References

External links

1991 births
Living people
HK 95 Panthers Považská Bystrica players
HK Dukla Trenčín players
Sportspeople from Považská Bystrica
Slovak ice hockey centres
Vancouver Giants players
HC Slovan Bratislava players
HC '05 Banská Bystrica players
HKM Zvolen players
HK Nitra players
Slovak expatriate ice hockey players in Canada